(born December 24, 1986) is a Japanese actress, dancer, model and beauty queen who was crowned Miss Universe 2007 in Mexico City.

Personal life
An only child, Riyo Mori began dancing at the age of 4. She has studied at Quinte Ballet School of Canada and also is a graduate from Centennial Secondary School in Belleville, Ontario, Canada. Mori also completed her Grade 11 year at Mount Douglas Secondary School in Victoria, British Columbia, Canada. She still possesses her first pair of ballet shoes.

On August 28, 2018, she married Brent Kaspar, an American attorney.

Miss Universe 2007
Mori was crowned Miss Universe on May 28, 2007, by the outgoing titleholder Zuleyka Rivera.

In the final competition, broadcast internationally on May 28, 2007, Mori was announced as one of fifteen semi-finalists who would move forward to compete for the title.  She achieved the highest score in the swimsuit competition, which advanced her to the top ten and the evening gown competition, in which she placed fourth. Mori's kimono-inspired black/floral evening gown of choice came from the Spring/Summer 2007 collection of Gucci.

In the last round, Mori was asked by Elle magazine fashion director and Project Runway judge Nina Garcia to speak about the one lesson she learned as a child that still affects her life. Mori said that since childhood she has been dancing and hence she was constantly surrounded by students and teachers.  Due to the interactions with them, she has learned to become always happy, patient, and positive in her life. She also expressed a desire to teach these principles to the next generation.

At the conclusion of the competition, she was crowned Miss Universe, becoming the second woman from Japan to hold the title. The first Miss Universe winner from Japan was Akiko Kojima in 1959.  Mori is the eleventh Asian woman to win the pageant.

Mori was the third Japanese woman to place in the top five at Miss Universe in the past decade.  Miyako Miyazaki placed fourth runner-up at Miss Universe 2003, and Mori's predecessor Kurara Chibana was first runner-up in 2006. Mori aims to use her success and popularity as a springboard into humanitarian causes. "I think I have a samurai soul, I'm very patient, and I can serve others." As of May 2008, Mori had traveled to Indonesia, Spain, the Bahamas, St. Kitts and Nevis, China, Mexico, Canada, Germany, Vietnam, France, Monaco, San Marino, Russia and Italy in addition to numerous trips and her homecoming in Japan. She also visited numerous cities in the United States.

Mori crowned her successor, Venezuela native Dayana Mendoza with a $120,000-USD tiara, Miss Universe 2008 on July 14, 2008 in Nha Trang, Vietnam.

Television
In subsequent interviews about her future, the new titleholder revealed plans to open a multicultural dance school in Tokyo.  She has also expressed enthusiasm about her audition for the role of Yaeko on the American television series Heroes.

Mori starred in Donald Trump's MTV reality show Pageant Place along with Rachel Smith (Miss USA 2007), Tara Conner, (former Miss USA 2006) Katie Blair (former Miss Teen USA 2006) and Hilary Cruz (Miss Teen USA 2007). The show started airing on October 10, 2007 and ran for eight episodes.

Mori appeared in Jessica Simpson's VH1 reality show The Price of Beauty in 2010 to showcase the standards of beauty in her home country, Japan.

In 2016, Mori was guest judge in the preliminary competition of 65th Miss Universe in the Mall of Asia Arena, Pasay, Metro Manila, Philippines on Fox. She also served as a judge at Miss Universe 2019.

References

External links

1986 births
Living people
Miss Universe 2007 contestants
Miss Universe winners
People from Shizuoka (city)
Japanese beauty pageant winners
Participants in American reality television series
Japanese female models